General elections were held in Suriname on 25 June 1958. The result was a victory for the National Party of Suriname, which won nine of the 21 seats.

Results

References

Suriname
Elections in Suriname
1958 in Suriname
Election and referendum articles with incomplete results